At least three warships of Japan have borne the name Hatsuyuki:

 , a  launched in 1906 and scrapped in 1928
 , a  launched in 1928 and sunk in 1943
 , a  launched in 1980 and decommissioned in 2010

Japanese Navy ship names
Imperial Japanese Navy ship names